SportsChannel Cincinnati was an American regional sports network owned by the Rainbow Media division of Cablevision, and operated as an affiliate of SportsChannel. Headquartered in Cincinnati, Ohio, the channel used to broadcast regional coverage of sports events throughout the Miami Valley, focusing mainly on professional sports teams based in the Cincinnati area.

History
The network launched on April 1, 1990, with coverage of Major League Baseball games involving the Cincinnati Reds as its flagship programming. The initial contract with the Reds gave SportsChannel 30 games in 1990, increasing to 35 and then 40 games in 1991 and 1992 respectively. Other programming was provided from SportsChannel Ohio including basketball games from the Midwestern Collegiate Conference and Mid-American Conference. The network also featured SportsChannel's NHL package and Notre Dame football. At launch, SportsChannel Cincinnati broadcast nightly from 5 PM to Midnight on weekdays and from 9 AM to Midnight on weekends. This was expanded to a 24-hour schedule beginning on January 1, 1994.

In 1996, the network's Reds broadcasts were fed to Tennessee and western North Carolina via Fox Sports South; much of that area is part of the Reds' home territory as defined by the league. 

On June 30, 1997, Fox/Liberty Networks (owned as a joint venture between News Corporation and Liberty Media) purchased a 40% interest in Cablevision's sports properties (including the SportsChannel networks, Madison Square Garden, and the New York Knicks and New York Rangers) for $850 million. In January 1998, SportsChannel was integrated into Fox Sports Net, a group of regional sports networks created by Fox/Liberty in November 1996. At that time, SportsChannel Cincinnati was folded into Fox Sports Ohio (the former SportsChannel Ohio), serving as a regional subfeed of that network.

References

Cincinnati
Defunct local cable stations in the United States
Sports in Cincinnati
Television channels and stations established in 1990
1990 establishments in Ohio
Television channels and stations disestablished in 1998
1998 disestablishments in Ohio
Television stations in Cincinnati
Defunct mass media in Ohio